Johan & Margaretha or sometimes just Margaretha is a resort in Suriname, located in the Commewijne District.  Its population at the 2012 census was 756. It is located along a peninsula northeast of Paramaribo. It is named after the coffee plantation Johan & Margaretha which was founded in 1745 by Johan Knöffel. It is safe to assume that his wife was called Margaretha. 

The resort has a clinic and a school. The nature reserve of Braamspunt is located in the Johan & Margaretha resort. The resort of Margaretha can only be reached by boat.

Frederiksdorp
Frederiksdorp (Sranan Tongo: Pikin Knuffel) is a village and former coffee and cocoa plantation located next to Johan & Margareta. Both plantations were owned by Johan Frederik Knöffel. 

In 2004, the plantation became a historical monument. Frederikdorp is located on the Commewijne River and has a ferry connection to Mariënburg. Frederiksdorp covers an area of 300 hectares, has beaches, and mangrove forests.

Location:

References

External links
 Federiksdorp.com (in Dutch)

Populated coastal places in Suriname
Populated places in Commewijne District
Resorts of Suriname